New York State Route 288 (NY 288) was a north–south state highway in Montgomery County, New York, in the United States. NY 288 was assigned in the early 1940s and existed until 1981 when ownership and maintenance of the road was transferred to Montgomery County. The NY 288 designation was subsequently removed, and its former routing became County Route 164 (CR 164).

Route description

It broke from the straight path near a junction with CR 120, turning northward into a brief but dense wooded area. The route continued through the narrow forest to a more open area just south of the Mohawk River and the New York State Thruway, where it ended at a junction with NY 5S east of the hamlet of Auriesville. Just southeast of the intersection is the National Shrine of the North American Martyrs, also known as the Auriesville Shrine.

History
The original designation of NY 288 was in northern Oswego County from Sandy Creek to Smartville, at a length of 6.36 miles. This designation was removed by 1940. Today this road is part of Oswego CR 15.

NY 288 was assigned in the early 1940s. The route remained intact until April 1, 1981, when ownership and maintenance of the route was transferred from the state of New York to Montgomery County as part of a highway maintenance swap between the two levels of government. The NY 288 designation was removed as a result and its former routing became CR 164.

Major intersections

See also

List of county routes in Montgomery County, New York

References

External links

288
Transportation in Montgomery County, New York